Qorveh is a city in Kurdistan Province, Iran.

Qorveh or Qerveh may also refer to:
 Qorveh-e Darjazin, Hamadan Province
 Qorveh, Kermanshah
 Qerveh, Zanjan
 Qorveh County, in Kurdistan Province